Azad Mohabbat is a 1974 Bollywood drama film directed by Batra Kaushalraj. The film stars Yogeeta Bali and Kiran Kumar. The film was produced by Sarvjeet who also acted in the movie. It is a thriller with love story angle and the plot revolves around the character Mohan Oberoi.

Soundtrack
Lyrics: Asad Bhopali

"Aankhon Ne Muhabbat Mein Bada Kaam Kiya Hai" - Mahendra Kapoor
"Dil Hai Dard-E-Muhabbat Ka Maara Bechaara" - Lata Mangeshkar
"Hum Kashmakash-E-Gham Se Guzar Kyon Nahi Jaate" - Lata Mangeshkar
"Kabhi Ek Nazar Idhar Bhi Aapki Ho Jaaye" - Asha Bhosle

External links
 

1974 films
1970s Hindi-language films
1974 drama films
Films scored by Laxmikant–Pyarelal